Lesley Sue Goldstein (May 2, 1946 – February 16, 2015), known professionally as Lesley Gore, was an American singer, songwriter, actress, and activist. At the age of 16, she recorded the pop hit "It's My Party", a US number one in 1963. She followed it up with ten further Billboard top 40 hits including "Judy's Turn to Cry" and "You Don't Own Me".

Gore later worked as an actress and television personality. She composed songs with her brother Michael Gore for the 1980 film Fame, for which he won an Academy Award. She hosted several editions of the LGBT-oriented public television show, In the Life, on American TV in the 2000s.

Early life
Gore was born Lesley Sue Goldstein in Brooklyn, New York City, into a middle-class Jewish family. The daughter of Leo Goldstein and Ronny Gore, her father was the owner of Peter Pan, a children's swimwear and underwear manufacturer, and later became a leading brand licensing agent in the apparel industry. She was raised in Tenafly, New Jersey, and attended the Dwight School for Girls in nearby Englewood. She also attended Sarah Lawrence College.

Career

1963–1979: Commercial success

When she recorded her version of "It's My Party" with Quincy Jones in 1963, she was a junior in high school. It became a number-one, nationwide hit. Gore's version was certified as a Gold record. It also marked the beginning of a time when fans would show up on her front lawn.

"It's My Party" was followed by many other hits for Gore, including the sequel, "Judy's Turn to Cry" (US number five); "She's a Fool" (US number five); the feminist-themed million-selling "You Don't Own Me", which held at number two for three weeks behind the Beatles' "I Want To Hold Your Hand"; "That's the Way Boys Are" (US No. 12); "Maybe I Know" (US No. 14/UK No. 20); "Look of Love" (US No. 27); and "Sunshine, Lollipops and Rainbows" (US number 13), which she sang during a bus scene from the 1965 movie, Ski Party. In 1965, she also appeared in the beach party film The Girls on the Beach in which she performed three songs: "Leave Me Alone", "It's Gotta Be You", and "I Don't Want to Be a Loser".

Gore was given first shot at recording "A Groovy Kind of Love" by songwriters Carole Bayer and Toni Wine with a melody borrowed from a sonatina by Muzio Clementi, but Shelby Singleton, a producer for Mercury subsidiary Smash Records, refused to let Gore record a song with the word "groovy" in its lyrics. The Mindbenders went on to record it, and it reached number two on the Billboard charts.

Gore recorded composer Marvin Hamlisch's first hit composition, "Sunshine, Lollipops and Rainbows", on May 21, 1963, while "It's My Party" was climbing the charts. Her record producer from 1963 to 1965 was Quincy Jones. Jones's dentist was Marvin Hamlisch's uncle, and Hamlisch asked his uncle to convey several songs to Jones. "Sunshine, Lollipops and Rainbows" was released on the LP Lesley Gore Sings of Mixed-Up Hearts, but did not surface as a single until June 1965. Hamlisch composed three other Gore associated songs: "California Nights", "That's the Way the Ball Bounces" and "One by One". "That's the Way the Ball Bounces" was recorded September 21, 1963, at A&R Studios in New York; it was released as the B-side of "That's the Way Boys Are" and appeared on the LP Boys Boys Boys. "One by One" was an unreleased track recorded on July 31, 1969, in New York and produced by Paul Leka; it first appeared on the Bear Family five-CD anthology of Gore's Mercury work entitled It's My Party (1994).

Gore was one of the featured performers in the T.A.M.I. Show concert film, which was recorded and released in 1964 by American International Pictures, and placed in the National Film Registry in 2006. Gore had one of the longest sets in the film, performing six songs, including "It's My Party", "You Don't Own Me", and "Judy's Turn to Cry".

Gore performed on two consecutive episodes of the Batman television series (January 19 and 25, 1967), in which she guest-starred as Pussycat, one of Catwoman's minions. In the January 19 episode "That Darn Catwoman", she lip-synched to the Bob Crewe-produced "California Nights", and in the January 25 episode "Scat! Darn Catwoman", she lip-synched to "Maybe Now". "California Nights", which Gore recorded for her 1967 album of the same name, returned her to the top twenty of the Hot 100. The single peaked at number 16 in March 1967 (14 weeks on the chart). It was her first top-40 hit since "My Town, My Guy and Me" in late 1965 and her first top-20 since "Sunshine, Lollipops, and Rainbows".  Gore also performed "It's My Party" and "We Know We're in Love" ten months earlier on the final episode of The Donna Reed Show, which aired on March 19, 1966.

After high school, while continuing to make appearances as a singer, Gore attended Sarah Lawrence College, studying English and American literature. At college, folk music was popularly lauded as "chic", whereas pop music was often derided as "uncool". "Had I been tall with blonde hair, had I been Mary Travers, I would have gotten along fine." She graduated in 1968.

Gore signed a contract with Mercury Records with a five-year term that carried her obligations to the company through the spring of 1968.  Her last big hit had been 12 months prior to this time, but Mercury still saw promise in her as an artist and believed that one of her singles would make it, as they had in the past. They offered a one-year extension on the initial contract, and Gore was formally contracted to Mercury for a sixth year. During this time, "He Gives Me Love (La La La)", a single release based on a Eurovision Song Contest winner, rose to number 96 on the Music Business charts, while bubbling under the Hot 100 in Billboard.  Mercury took out a full-page ad in the trades to support the single, but its airplay was spotty, becoming a hit in only a few major markets.  She was then paired with the successful soul producers Kenny Gamble, Leon Huff, and Thom Bell for two singles that took her into the "soul" genre:  "I'll Be Standing By" and "Take Good Care (Of My Heart)".  These songs did not fit the image Mercury had crafted for her, and the singles were not played.  Her contract with Mercury ended after the release of "98.6/Lazy Day" and "Wedding Bell Blues" failed to make headway on the charts.

In 1970, she signed with Crewe Records and was reunited with producer Bob Crewe, who had produced her album California Nights. Her first release under the label, "Why Doesn't Love Make Me Happy", was a moderate hit on the Adult Contemporary chart, but none of her other singles would prove to be successful. She left Crewe Records in 1971 when the label went bankrupt.

In 1972, Gore signed with MoWest Records, a subsidiary of Motown, and in July of that year released her first studio album in five years, Someplace Else Now. All of the songs were either written or co-written by Gore, with collaborators Ellen Weston and her brother Michael. Due to the failure of the album's sole single, "She Said That", along with poor promotion, Someplace Else Now died on the shelf.

1980–2014: As composer
Gore composed songs for the soundtrack of the 1980 film Fame, for which she received an Academy Award nomination for "Out Here on My Own", written with her brother Michael. Michael won the Academy Award for Best Original Song for the theme song of the same film. Gore played concerts and appeared on television throughout the 1980s and 1990s.

Gore co-wrote a song, "My Secret Love", for the 1996 film Grace of My Heart.  The film includes a subplot about a young singer named Kelly Porter, who is based in part on Gore and is played by Bridget Fonda. The character, who is a closeted lesbian, performs "My Secret Love" in the film.

In 2005, Gore recorded Ever Since (her first album of new material since Love Me By Name in 1976), with producer/songwriter Blake Morgan, with the label Engine Company Records. The album received favorable reviews from The New York Times, Rolling Stone, Billboard, and other national press. The album also included a revised version of "You Don't Own Me", about which the New York Daily News wrote: "In Lesley Gore's new version of 'You Don't Own Me'—cut more than 40 years after its initial recording—she lends a pop classic new life." Gore commented: "Without the loud backing track, I could wring more meaning from the lyric". And: "It's a song that takes on new meaning every time you sing it."

Personal life
Beginning in 2003, Gore hosted several editions of the PBS television series In the Life, which focused on LGBTQ+ issues. In a 2005 interview with After Ellen, she stated she was a lesbian and had been in a relationship with luxury jewelry designer Lois Sasson since 1982. She had known about her attraction to women from the time she was 20 and stated that although the music business was "totally homophobic", she never felt she had to pretend she was straight. "I just kind of lived my life naturally and did what I wanted to do," she said. "I didn't avoid anything, I didn't put it in anybody's face."

Gore had been working on a memoir and a Broadway show based on her life when she died of lung cancer on February 16, 2015, at the NYU Langone Medical Center in Manhattan, New York City, at the age of 68. At the time of her death, Gore and Sasson had been together for 33 years. They planned to be married in the summer of 2015.

Her New York Times obituary stated, "with songs like 'It’s My Party,' 'Judy’s Turn to Cry', and the indelibly defiant 1964 single 'You Don’t Own Me' — all recorded before she was 18 — Gore made herself the voice of teenaged girls aggrieved by fickle boyfriends, moving quickly from tearful self-pity to fierce self-assertion."

Awards and recognition
In 1964, "It's My Party" was nominated for a Grammy Award for rock-and-roll recording.

National Public Radio named Lesley Gore Sings of Mixed-Up Hearts, Gore's second album, as forebearer of one of the top 150 albums recorded by women. The album missed the official list (1964–present) because it was released in 1963. "She is a forebearer for her assertion of feminine power in pop, and her validation of a female perspective."

Lesley Gore’s papers were donated to the New York Public Library for the Performing Arts and became accessible to the public in 2022. Catalogued by the library and her partner Lois Sasson, it includes family photos, scrapbook pages, annotated music and lyrics, business files, an unfinished memoir, and sound and video recordings.

Discography

 I'll Cry If I Want To (1963)
 Lesley Gore Sings of Mixed-Up Hearts (1963)
 Boys, Boys, Boys (1964)
 Girl Talk (1964)
 My Town, My Guy & Me (1965)
 Lesley Gore Sings All About Love  (1966)
 Off and Running (1967, canceled)
 California Nights (1967)
 Magic Colors (1967, canceled)
 Someplace Else Now (1972)
 Love Me By Name (1976)
 The Canvas Can Do Miracles (1982)
 Ever Since (2005)
 Magic Colors: The Lost Album (2011)''

Filmography

Film

Television

References

External links

 Discography
 

1946 births
2015 deaths
20th-century American actresses
21st-century American actresses
20th-century American singers
21st-century American singers
20th-century American women singers
21st-century American women singers
Actresses from New Jersey
Actresses from New York City
American child singers
American women singer-songwriters
American women pop singers
Child pop musicians
Dwight-Englewood School alumni
Deaths from lung cancer in New York (state)
Feminist musicians
Jewish American musicians
Jewish American songwriters
Jewish feminists
American lesbian artists
Lesbian feminists
American lesbian musicians
LGBT Jews
American LGBT singers
LGBT people from New Jersey
LGBT people from New York (state)
Mercury Records artists
Musicians from Brooklyn
People from Tenafly, New Jersey
Sarah Lawrence College alumni
Singer-songwriters from New Jersey
Singers from New York City
20th-century American LGBT people
21st-century American LGBT people
21st-century American Jews
Singer-songwriters from New York (state)